Piovene may refer to:

Places 
 Palazzo Soranzo Piovene, also called Soranzo Piovene alla Maddalena, Renaissance-style palace on the Grand Canal, Venice
 Piovene Rocchette, a town in the province of Vicenza, Veneto, northern Italy
 Villa Piovene, Palladian villa built in Lugo di Vicenza

People with the surname 
 Agostino Piovene, 18th-century Venetian librettist; see, for example, Vivaldi's Bajazet
 Guido Piovene (1907–1974), Italian writer and journalist